Bira is an urban locality (an urban-type settlement) in Obluchensky District of the Jewish Autonomous Oblast, Russia. Population:

History
Bira railway station was built in 1908. In 1937, a larger railway station and a depot were constructed.

In 2006, the Chief Rabbi of the Jewish Autonomous Oblast, Mordechai Scheiner, visited Bira to inspect local cemeteries and gather information about the Jews buried there in the years prior to World War II.

See also
Jews and Judaism in the Jewish Autonomous Oblast

References

Urban-type settlements in the Jewish Autonomous Oblast
Populated places established in 1908
Jewish agricultural colonies in the Russian Empire
1908 establishments in the Russian Empire